The 2018–19 season was Bologna Football Club 1909's fourth season back in Serie A, after the club's relegation at the end of the 2013–14 season. Having finished 15th the previous season, the club competed in Serie A, finishing 10th, and in the Coppa Italia, where they were eliminated in the round of 16 by Juventus.

Roberto Donadoni, who coached the club during the 2015–16, 2016–17, and 2017–18 seasons, departed Bologna on 24 May 2018; he was replaced by former Juventus and Milan player and Italy international Filippo Inzaghi on 13 June. After a long period spent in 18th place and thus within the relegation zone, Inzaghi was in turn replaced by Siniša Mihajlović, on 28 January 2019.

Players

Squad information

Transfers

In

Loans in

Out

Loans out

Competitions

Serie A

League table

Results summary

Results by round

Matches

Coppa Italia

Statistics

Appearances and goals

|-
! colspan=14 style=background:#dcdcdc; text-align:center| Goalkeepers

|-
! colspan=14 style=background:#dcdcdc; text-align:center| Defenders

|-
! colspan=14 style=background:#dcdcdc; text-align:center| Midfielders

|-
! colspan=14 style=background:#dcdcdc; text-align:center| Forwards

|-
! colspan=14 style=background:#dcdcdc; text-align:center| Players transferred out during the season

Goalscorers

Last updated: 25 May 2019

Clean sheets

Last updated: 25 May 2019

Disciplinary record

Last updated: 25 May 2019

References

Bologna F.C. 1909 seasons
Bologna